Tiiu Parmas (18 December 1943 – 23 August 2011) was an Estonian tennis player. She competed under her maiden name Tiiu Kivi, until her marriage to coach Jaak Parmas in 1969.

Born in Tallinn, Parmas was the Soviet national champion in 1968 and made the singles third round of the 1969 French Open. Parmas, who was named Estonian Female Athlete of the Year in 1970, won three medals for the Soviet Union at the 1970 Summer Universiade, including gold medals for singles and mixed doubles.

References

External links
 

1943 births
2011 deaths
Soviet female tennis players
Estonian female tennis players
Medalists at the 1970 Summer Universiade
Sportspeople from Tallinn
Universiade gold medalists for the Soviet Union
Universiade bronze medalists for the Soviet Union
Universiade medalists in tennis